Northampton County High School – West STEM was a public high school located in Gaston, North Carolina.

Overview 
The school colors were navy blue, grey and white, and they were known as the Hurricanes. The school was usually referred to as "West" by many students and community members.

History 
The school's origins date back to Gumberry High School, which was constructed in the mid-1970s and was located in Gumberry, North Carolina. In the late 1980s, the district decided to consolidate and open a new high school which was closer to the portion of Northampton county that borders Lake Gaston. It was not until 1991 that the Northampton County School Board opened the doors to newly constructed Northampton County High SchoolWest.

In the 2004–05 school year, the school was then split into two schools, NCHSWest and NCHSWest STEM. NCHSWest STEM was a science, technology, engineering, math, and freshman academy, that was part of the North Carolina New Schools' Project. NCHSWest consisted of grades 10–12 at that time. In 2009–10, NCHSWest was renamed NCHSWest STEM and included grades 7–12.

Northampton County High SchoolWest and Northampton County High SchoolEast merged in the summer of 2012 to become a single school: Northampton County High School (NCHS). The school then moved on what was the NCHS-East campus in Conway, North Carolina. Now known as the Jaguars, the school colors are teal, white and navy blue.

Programs 
NCHSWest STEM offered various number of athletic programs. The programs offered included volleyball, basketball, American football, baseball, softball, cheerleading, marching band and pep band. NCHSWest STEM athletics are known primarily for its basketball and football programs, and band.

The football team went 13–1 in 2006 before losing to Manteo High School in the Eastern Finals, and were 14–2 in 2005, where the team finished as runner-ups in the 1A State Championship game against Elkin High School.

References 

Public high schools in North Carolina
Schools in Northampton County, North Carolina
Public middle schools in North Carolina